The 1878 Down by-election was fought on 17 May 1878.  The byelection was fought due to the death of the incumbent Liberal MP, James Sharman Crawford.  It was won by the Conservative candidate Viscount Castlereagh.

References

1878 elections in the United Kingdom
By-elections to the Parliament of the United Kingdom in County Down constituencies
19th century in County Down
1878 elections in Ireland